Hilde Radusch (6 November 1903 – 2 August 1994) was a German political activist (KPD, SPD) who became involved in anti-fascist resistance.   As the twentieth century progressed she also became increasingly prominent as a Feminist and Lesbian activist.

Throughout her life Radusch kept a diary.  Accessed by researchers after she died, her own writings have provided an insightful, and at times engagingly laconic, commentary on her eventful life.

Life
Hilde Radusch was born in Altdamm, directly across the river from Stettin, but the family relocated while she was still young to Weimar in central southern Germany.   Her father was a postal worker who in 1915 was killed in the war, but by that time he had instilled in his daughter a spirit of independence and determination which made for a sometimes difficult relationship with her widowed mother during her teenage years.   When she was 18 Radusch left home and headed for Berlin where she gained a training place at the Pestalozzi-Fröbel Training Institute.   She emerged in 1922 with a qualification in infant care and education.

1922 was also the year in which she joined the Young Communists.   By 1924, together with Hedwig Remmele, she was taking a lead in the recently founded Berlin "Red Women's and Girls' Association" ("Roten Frauen- und Mädchenbunde"), also writing articles for the movement's newspaper, "Die Frauenwacht" ("Women Watch").   However, finding no employment opportunities for communists in infant care, in 1923 she took a job as a telephone switchboard operator with the post office.   It was while working for the post office that Radusch met Maria, described in one source as "her first girl friend", and at some point the two of them moved in together. Radusch continued working for the post office till 1930.

In 1924 she had joined the Communist Party itself, and from 1929 till 1932 Radusch served as a Communist Party city councillor in Berlin.   In 1932 she was no longer listed as a communist candidate for the city council elections, due to the scandalising impact of her disinclination to conceal her lesbian private life.

In 1931 Radusch joined the Communist party's alternative "special" postal workers' trades union.   The copies of her reports imply a belief in Moscow that she could possess expertise that would be helpful to the development of a Soviet postal service.   In September 1932 she traveled to the Soviet Union as part of a delegation from the German communist party, "visiting the Soviet postal operation".   Along with Moscow, the visit, which lasted several months, took in Leningrad and Odessa.   In January 1933 the political backdrop was transformed when the Nazi Party took power and converted Germany into a one-party dictatorship.   Political activity - except in support of the Nazi Party - became illegal.   At the end of February 1933 the Reichstag fire was instantly blamed on the Communists, and in March 1933 those identified as Communists began to be arrested.   At the end of March 1933 Radusch moved out of the home she was sharing with her partner Maria in order to protect the latter's position.   Maria was still working for the post office which made her a "public servant":  they thought her employment would be imperilled if she was living in sin with a former communist city councillor.

Radusch was home from the Soviet Union by March 1933, and at 6 in the morning on 6 April 1933 the authorities turned up and arrested her in connection with her Communist Party and other "resistance" activities.   She was invited to sign an inaccurate record of her initial interrogation which would have amounted to a confession of guilt:  when she refused to sign she was informed by her Gestapo interrogators that she would therefore be taken into "protective custody" ("Schutzhaft").   She was taken, in the first instance, to the police station in Alexanderplatz where she was one of 36 women placed in a room.   Two of the detainees at once announced that they were masseuses and started to massage one another but were quickly separated.   After a month she ended up in the Barnim Street women's prison, along with around two hundred other "politicals".   Unlike those identified as "criminals", the "politicals" were not held in solitary confinement.   An affair with a cellmate made the detention easier to endure, although being allocated a thin-walled cell positioned next to the warders' sitting room was in some respects inhibiting.

At the end of September 1933 she was released with a number of the other detainees identified as "politicals", and moved to central Berlin where she was placed under Gestapo surveillance.   Her political history made it hard to find work, but in the end she found a job with Siemens, where she was able to pursue her "illegal party work" inside the company.

In 1939 she met Else "Eddy" Klopsch who subsequently became her life partner.   One of Eddy's many achievements was winning the confidence of Radusch's mother, who approved of her daughter "settling down".  From 1941 Hilde and Eddy ran a little restaurant.   Initially their application for a restaurant license was refused under pressure from the local SS (The Nazi party's quasi-military wing), who deemed Radusch "politically unreliable", but eventually they found premises and established a "shop", registered in the name of Mr Klopsch (Eddy's father).   The business was located in Berlin's Scheunen quarter and contained much furniture suitable for the restaurant, which had been left behind by the previous occupants.   Like many premises in the Scheunen quarter, their shop had previously been owned by Jews, who had now relocated.   They never did obtain official permission to run the shop as a restaurant.   However, all shops in the neighbourhood were required to display a "Forbidden to Jews" ("Für Juden verboten!") sign in the window, and in Mr Klopsch's shop window, in front of this sign, was placed, without further explanation, a restaurant menu.    The restaurant later became a refuge for "illegals" when the underground Communist Party leadership resumed contact with Radusch and started sending her women released from detention to be hidden and looked after.   Radusch and Klopsch did not always succeed in these difficult tasks:  they were unable to save Henny Lemberg, a Jewish Communist entrusted to their care and whom they befriended, from being deported to an extermination camp.

The attempt to assassinate Hitler on 20 July 1944 failed in its primary objective, but it did greatly unsettle the Nazi leadership. Some years earlier the Nazis had compiled a list of communist and socialist politicians and activists from the Weimar years who might be rounded up in the event of a deterioration in the domestic political situation. By 1944 the list was somewhat out of date, many of those named on it having already been murdered or died from natural causes, but Hilde Radusch, whose name was also on the list, was very much alive and, by this stage, working in a bank. The mass roundup of political opponents was nevertheless implemented overnight on 22/23 August 1944. Fortunately Eddy Klopsch had a friend in the police service who warned the women of the government's intentions, and they were able to escape in time to avoid capture. They spent the rest of the war years hiding in a large allotment shed in Prieros, a hamlet set in marshy countryside between Berlin and Cottbus, that was for most purposes far from the beaten track, and where they had purchased a piece of land when first they got together, back in 1940. However, now they had to survive in it themselves, without any ration coupons. There were occasions when Radusch managed to exchange a bed sheet for meat. They were sometimes able to find wood for heating themselves in the woods, and they learned to concoct a tobacco substitute from blackberries. Nevertheless, by the time Berlin was destructively liberated by the Red army in April/May 1945 they were starving.   

The end of the war found the entire central portion of what had been Germany administered as the Soviet occupation zone.   Radusch threw herself into the vast reconstruction effort that now began.   Between June 1945 and February 1946 she was employed in the district "Victims of Fascism" department for the district government of Schöneberg, processing claims for emergency food and clothing.   In 1946 she was a co-instigator of a "child rescue" ("Rettet die Kinder") project.   At the same time, seeing Soviet communism arriving in Germany with the Red army, she now began to nurture doubts about the Communist Party which had been the focus of her politics for more than twenty years.   She took a decision to resign from it and made her intention known.   In January 1946 the local party leadership anticipated her resignation, however, and expelled her, using her lesbian relationship to justify the move.   She was also bombarded with threatening letters, and denounced her to her employers at the town hall.   When she went to see her boss to clarify matters, she found a thick personnel file, containing statements from three leading communists, denouncing her as a lesbian, for which reason she should no longer be employed in a public office.   The comrades had their way, and in February 1946 she lost her job.   Wartime deprivation had also taken its toll, and by now she was suffering from Rheumatoid arthritis. A few years later she was forced to take early retirement, supported by a very meagre pension.

In 1948 she joined the by now, within the Soviet occupation zone, badly emaciated Social Democratic Party (SDP).   Her partner Eddy, six years younger than she, had been physically handicapped since before they met, her condition sufficient to justify a (very small) disability pension.   Eddy now bought a Bric-à-brac shop.   Despite the poor health from which they both suffered, the shop supported the two of them till 1960 when Eddy died of cancer.   Bereavement hit Hilde Radusch hard.

The 1970s brought a new wave of feminism, and Radusch joined in.   She co-founded L74, a Berlin group of older lesbians.   She became an editor on "Our Little Newspaper" ("Unserer Kleinen Zeitung" /UKZ), described by one source as the first lesbian newspaper after the Second World War.   A few years later she was also a co-founder of the "Women's Research, Education and Information Centre" ("Frauenforschungs-, -bildungs- und -informationszentrum" /  FFBIZ).

It was not till eighteen years after her death that the authorities in Berlin-Schöneberg officially commemorated this extraordinary politician.   In 2012 a memorial was set up at the corner of Eisenacher Straße (Eisenach Street) and Winterfeldtstraße (Winterfeld Street), consisting of three tablets dedicated to her.   It is the first public memorial in Berlin commemorating a lesbian victim of Nazi persecution.

References

Politicians from Weimar
People from Pomerania
Politicians from Berlin
Communists in the German Resistance
Lesbian politicians
Communist Party of Germany politicians
Social Democratic Party of Germany politicians
German socialist feminists
1903 births
1994 deaths
20th-century LGBT people